The 2020–21 Swiss Challenge League (referred to as the Brack.ch Challenge League for sponsoring reasons) is the 18th season of the Swiss Challenge League, the second tier of competitive football in Switzerland, under its current name. The season started on 18 September 2020 and is scheduled to end on 30 May 2021. The start of the season was delayed due to the COVID-19 pandemic in Switzerland. The league held its winter break between 22 December 2020 and 23 January 2021.

Participating teams
A total of 10 teams participate in the league. 2019–20 Swiss Challenge League champions FC Lausanne-Sport and runner-up FC Vaduz were promoted to the 2020–21 Swiss Super League. They were replaced by Neuchâtel Xamax FCS, who got relegated after finishing last-placed in the 2019–20 Swiss Super League, and FC Thun, who lost the relegation game. No team was relegated due to the cancellation of the 2019–20 Swiss Promotion League caused by the COVID-19 pandemic in Switzerland.

Stadia and locations

Personnel and kits

Managerial changes

League table

Results

First and Second Round

Third and Fourth Round

Statistics

Top scorers

Awards

Brack.ch Challenge League Best Player 2020:  Asumah Abubakar (Kriens)

Promotion play-offs

References

External links
 

Swiss Challenge League
2020–21 in Swiss football
Swiss Challenge League seasons